Deinhugia is a monotypic moth genus of the family Erebidae. Its only species, Deinhugia nigra, is found in Cameroon and Gabon. Both the genus and the species were first described by Bernard Laporte in 1974.

References

Calpinae
Monotypic moth genera